Blake Cooper (born October 10, 2001) is an American actor, best known for playing the role of Chuck in The Maze Runner. Cooper was born in Atlanta, Georgia on a small animal farm. He grew up as a Boy Scout and is well acquainted with animal training.

Cooper was signed to J Pervis Talent Agency by Joy Pervis when he was 10, after being seen performing at a local event. Immediately after signing, Cooper auditioned and landed his first co-star on BET's The Game. Shortly thereafter, he got a callback for the character of Ethan on USA Network's Necessary Roughness where he impressed and entertained the room, which led to booking the role.

In April 2013, Cooper was cast as Chuck in 20th Century Fox's The Maze Runner. Cooper related to the character of 'Chuck' in James Dashner's international bestselling adventure story, The Maze Runner. He contacted Wes Ball through Twitter for the role in the film.

Filmography

Films

Television

References

External links

American male film actors
American male television actors
American male child actors
Male actors from Atlanta
Living people
2001 births